CRIMISUS or CRIMISSUS (Κριμισός, Lycophr., Dionys.; Κριμησός, Plut.; Κριμισσός, Ael.), a river of Sicily, in the neighbourhood of Segesta, celebrated for the great battle fought on its banks in B.C. 339, in which Timoleon, with only about 11,000 troops, partly Syracusans, partly mercenaries, totally defeated a Carthaginian army of above 70,000 men. This victory was one of the greatest blows ever sustained by the Carthaginian power, and secured to the Greek cities in Sicily a long period of tranquility. (Plut. Tim. 25–29; Diod. 16.77-81; Corn. Nep. Tim. 2.) But though the battle itself is described in considerable detail both by Plutarch and Diodorus, they afford scarcely any information concerning its locality, except that it was fought in the part of the island at that time subject to Carthage (ἐν τῇ τῶν Καρχηδονίων ἐπικρατείᾳ). The river Crimisus itself is described as a considerable stream, which being flooded at the time by storms of rain, contributed much to cause confusion in the Carthaginian army. Yet its name is not found in any of the ancient geographers, and the only clue to its position is afforded by the fables which connect it with the city of Segesta.

According to the legend received among the Greeks, Aegestes or Aegestus (the Acestes of Virgil), the founder and eponymous hero of Egesta, was the son of a Trojan woman by the river-god Crimisus, who cohabited with her under the form of a dog. (Lycophr. 961; Tzetz. ad loc.; Verg. A. 5.38; and Serv. ad Aen. 1.550.) For this reason the river Crimisus continued to be worshipped by the Segestans, and its effigy as a dog was placed on their coins (Ael. VH 2.33; Eckhel, vol. i. p. 234): Dionysius also distinctly speaks of the Trojans under Elymus and Aegestus as settling in the territory of the Sicani, about the river Crimisus (1.52); hence it seems certain that we must look for that river in the neighbourhood, or at least within the territory of Segesta, and it is probable that Fazello was correct in identifying it with the stream now called Fiume di S. Bartolommeo or Fizmne Freddo, which flows about 5 miles E. of Segesta, and falls into the Gulf of Castellamare at a short distance from the town of that name. Cluverius supposed it to be the stream which flows by the ruins of Entella, and falls into the Hypsas or Belici, thus flowing to the S. coast: but the arguments which he derives from the account of the operations of Timoleon are not sufficient to outweigh those which connect the Crimisus with Segesta. (Fazell. de Reb. Sic. vii. p. 299; Cluver. Sicil. p. 269.)

References

Deities in the Aeneid
Roman mythology
Potamoi